Paul Timothy Fincham (born 23 January 1959) is a British composer.

Early life and family
Fincham is the younger brother of television producer Peter Fincham. Educated at the independent Tonbridge School, Fincham read music at Gonville and Caius College, Cambridge. Whilst at Cambridge, he was music director of the Cambridge Footlights. In 2012, following a career in the corporate world, Fincham returned to composing, based in London.

Notable compositions 

In February 2017, Fincham's first feature film score for A Reason to Leave won Best Original Score at the London International Filmmakers Festival. The film, written and directed by Norman Gregory, also won Best Film at the same awards.

Later that year, Fincham was commissioned by the London Philharmonic Choir to write a new Christmas carol. On 20 December 2017, "Ring the Bells" was premiered at the Royal Albert Hall at the choir's concerts presented by Alan Titchmarsh. In 2018, "Ring the Bells" was published by Boosey & Hawkes.

In 2018, Fincham was commissioned by the British Museum to write a new work inspired by their Celtic Collection. On 21 June 2018, along with his violin piece, Suilven, Awen (meaning poetic inspiration in ancient Welsh/Breton/Cornish) was premiered by the London Philharmonic Choir under their artistic director, Neville Creed.

Fincham's first opera The Happy Princess, based on "The Happy Prince" by Oscar Wilde, with a libretto by Jessica Duchen, was premiered by the Youth Company at Garsington Opera in August 2019.

References

External links 

1959 births
Living people
People educated at Tonbridge School
Alumni of Gonville and Caius College, Cambridge
21st-century classical composers
British male classical composers
British classical composers
21st-century British male musicians